The 1967 FIBA European Championship, commonly called FIBA EuroBasket 1967, was the fifteenth FIBA EuroBasket regional basketball championship, held by FIBA Europe.

Venues

First round

Group A – Helsinki

Group B – Tampere

Knockout stage

Places 13 – 16 in Tampere

Places 9 – 12 in Helsinki

Places 5 – 8 in Tampere

Places 1 – 4 in Helsinki

Finals

Final standings

Awards

Team rosters
1. Soviet Union: Sergei Belov, Modestas Paulauskas, Gennadi Volnov, Jaak Lipso, Anatoly Polivoda, Priit Tomson, Tõnno Lepmets, Alzhan Zharmukhamedov, Vladimir Andreev, Zurab Sakandelidze, Yuri Selikhov, Anatoli Krikun (Coach: Alexander Gomelsky)

2. Czechoslovakia: Jiří Zídek Sr., Jiří Zedníček, Jir i Ammer, Vladimir Pistelak, Frantisek Konvicka, Bohumil Tomasek, Robert Mifka, Jiri Ruzicka, Jan Bobrovsky, Karel Baroch, Jiří Marek, Celestyn Mrazek (Coach: Vladimir Heger)

3. Poland: Mieczysław Łopatka, Bohdan Likszo, Włodzimierz Trams, Grzegorz Korcz, Bolesław Kwiatkowski, Mirosław Kuczyński, Czesław Malec, Henryk Cegielski, Maciej Chojnacki, Waldemar Kozak, Kazimierz Frelkiewicz, Zbigniew Dregier (Coach: Witold Zagórski)

4. Bulgaria: Mincho Dimov, Ivan Vodenicharski, Cvjatko Barchovski, Georgi Khristov, Emil Mikhajlov, Slavejko Rajchev, Pando Pandov, Khristo Dojchinov, Georgi Genev, Boris Krastev, Temelaki Dimitrov, Bojcho Branzov (Coach: Kiril Khajtov)

9. Yugoslavia: Borut Basin, Ljubodrag Simonović, Zoran Marojević, Dragan Kapičić, Vladimir Cvetković, Dragoslav Ražnatović, Ratomir Tvrdić, Krešimir Ćosić, Damir Šolman, Goran Brajković, Aljoša Žorga, Petar Skansi (Coach: Ranko Žeravica)

References

External links

Linguasport.com about EuroBasket 1967

1967
1967–68 in European basketball
1967 in Finnish sport
International basketball competitions hosted by Finland
1960s in Helsinki
September 1967 sports events in Europe
October 1967 sports events in Europe
Sports competitions in Tampere
International sports competitions in Helsinki